This list of nuclides shows observed nuclides that either are stable or, if radioactive, have half-lives longer than one hour. This represents isotopes of the first 105 elements, except for elements 87 (francium) and 102 (nobelium). At least 3,300 nuclides have been experimentally characterized (see List of radioactive nuclides by half-life for the nuclides with decay half-lives less than one hour).

A nuclide is defined conventionally as an experimentally examined bound collection of protons and neutrons that either is stable or has an observed decay mode.

Introduction

There are 251 known so-called stable nuclides. Many of these in theory could decay through spontaneous fission, alpha decay, double beta decay, etc. with a very long half-life, but no radioactive decay has yet been observed. Thus, the number of stable nuclides is subject to change if some of these 251 are determined to be very long-lived radioactive nuclides in the future. In this article, the "stable" nuclides are divided into three tables, one for nuclides that are theoretically stable (meaning no decay mode is possible) and nuclides that can theoretically undergo spontaneous fission but have not been evaluated to check for evidence of this happening, one for nuclides that can theoretically undergo forms of decay other than spontaneous fission but have not been evaluated, and finally a table of nuclides that can theoretically decay and have been evaluated but without detecting any decay. In this latter table, where a decay has been predicted theoretically but never observed experimentally (either directly or through finding an excess of the daughter), the theoretical decay mode is given in parentheses and have "> number" in the half-life column to show the lower limit for the half-life based on experimental observation. Such nuclides are considered to be "stable" until a decay has been observed in some fashion. For example, tellurium-123 was reported to be radioactive, but the same experimental group later retracted this report, and it presently remains observationally stable.

The next group is the primordial radioactive nuclides. These have been measured to be radioactive, or decay products have been identified (tellurium-128, barium-130). There are (currently) 35 of these (see these nuclides), of which 24 have half-lives longer than  years. With most of these 24, decay is difficult to observe and for most purposes they can be regarded as effectively stable. Bismuth-209 is notable as it is the only naturally occurring isotope of an element which was long considered stable. They are the primary source of radiogenic heating and radioactive decay products. Together, there are a total of 286 primordial nuclides.

The list then covers the ~700 radionuclides with half-lives longer than 1 hour, split into two tables, half-lives greater than one day and less than one day.

Over 60 nuclides that have half-lives too short to be primordial can be detected in nature as a result of later production by natural processes, mostly in trace amounts. These include ~44 radionuclides occurring in the decay chains of primordial uranium and thorium (radiogenic nuclides), such as radon-222. Others are the products of interactions with energetic cosmic-rays (e.g. cosmic ray spallation) (cosmogenic nuclides), such as carbon-14. This gives a total of about 350 naturally occurring nuclides. Other nuclides may be occasionally produced naturally by rare cosmogenic interactions or as a result of other natural nuclear reactions (nucleogenic nuclides), but are difficult to detect.

Further shorter-lived nuclides have been detected in the spectra of stars (e.g. technetium, promethium, and some actinides). The remaining nuclides are known solely from artificial nuclear transmutation. Some, such as caesium-137, are found in the environment but as a result of contamination from releases of man-made nuclear fission product (from nuclear weapons, nuclear reactors, and other processes). Other are produced artificially for industrial or medical purposes.

List legend
Each group of radionuclides, starting with the longest-lived primordial radionuclides, is sorted by decreasing half-life, but the tables are sortable by other columns.

{| class="wikitable"
|-
| α
| α decay
|-
| β−
| β− decay
|-
| β−β−
| double β− decay
|-
| ε
| electron capture
|-
| β+
| β+ decay
|-
| β+β+
| double β+ decay
|-
| SF
| spontaneous fission
|-
| IT
| isomeric transition
|}

Full list

Theoretically stable nuclides

These are the theoretically stable nuclides, ordered by "energy".

Nuclides that are observationally stable, having theoretical decay modes other than spontaneous fission

Ordered by "energy".

Observationally stable nuclides for which decay has been searched for but not found (only lower bounds known)

Ordered by lower bound on half-life.

Primordial radioactive nuclides (half-life > 108 years)

Ordered by half-life.

Radionuclides with half-lives of 10,000 years to 108 years

Ordered by half-life.

Radionuclides with half-lives of 10 years to 10,000 years

Ordered by half-life.

Radionuclides with half-lives of 1 day to 10 years

Ordered by half-life.

Radionuclides with half-lives of 1 hour to 1 day

Ordered by half-life.

Radionuclides with half-lives of 1 minute to 1 hour

Radionuclides with half-lives of 1 second to 1 minute

Radionuclides with half-lives less than 1 second

See also 
Isotope geochemistry
List of elements by stability of isotopes
List of radioactive nuclides by half-life
Monoisotopic element
Mononuclidic element
Primordial nuclide
Radionuclide
Stable nuclide
Table of nuclides

Sources
Almost all data are taken from reference. For more recent updates, see reference. These sources do not indicate whether certain heavy isotopes starting from Lr, Rf, Db, ... (etc.) were produced, observed, or only predicted from estimated data.

Notes

References

External links
National Nuclear Data Center, Brookhaven National Laboratory
The 2016 Atomic Mass Evaluation, AMDC
Karlsruhe Nuclide Chart, 9th edition, 2015, Joseph Magill, Gerda Pfennig, Raymond Dreher, Zsolt Sóti
National Isotope Development Center Reference information on isotopes, and coordination and management of isotope production, availability, and distribution
Isotope Development & Production for Research and Applications (IDPRA) U.S. Department of Energy program for isotope production and production research and development
Accelerator Systems and Stable Isotopes Group at ORNL
Atomic Weights and Isotopic Compositions for All Elements U.S. National Institute of Standards and Technology
Table of nuclides (compact, with energy per baryon) Overview picture for energy of nuclides

Tables of nuclides